Biotechnic & Histochemistry is a peer-reviewed scientific journal that covers all aspects of histochemistry and microtechnic in the biological sciences from botany to cell biology to medicine. It is published by Taylor & Francis on behalf of the Biological Stain Commission. The journal was established in 1926 as Stain Technology by Harold J. Conn. It obtained its current title in 1991. The editor-in-chief is G. S. Nettleton.

Abstracting and indexing 
The journal is abstracted and indexed in Index Medicus/MEDLINE/PubMed, Current Contents/Life Sciences, Science Citation Index, and EMBASE/Excerpta Medica. According to the Journal Citation Reports, the journal has a 2020 impact factor of 1.718.

References

External links 
 

Publications established in 1926
Biotechnology journals
Histology
Taylor & Francis academic journals
English-language journals